Robert Livingston Gerry Jr. (December 5, 1911 – December 21, 1979) was an American polo player.

Early life
Gerry was born in New York City on December 5, 1911 to Robert L. Gerry Sr. and Cornelia Harriman.  His eldest brother was Elbridge T. Gerry, Sr. and his younger twin brothers were Henry Averell Gerry and Edward Harriman Gerry.  Robert's father, a successful real estate developer, died at the family's estate, Aknusti, at the age of 81 on October 31, 1957, just a few hours after his brother, former U. S. Senator Peter Goelet Gerry, died in Providence, Rhode Island.

Family
Robert L. Gerry, Jr. was the nephew of U.S. Senator Peter Goelet Gerry, Governor W. Averell Harriman, Junior League founder Mary Harriman, and E. Roland Harriman.  His maternal grandfather was railroad baron E.H. Harriman and his paternal great-great grandfather was Thomas Russell Gerry, his great-great grandfather was Elbridge Gerry, a signer of the Declaration of Independence and Vice President of the United States.

Sporting career

Polo career
In 1929, he won the USPA Open National Interscholastic Championship. In 1933, he won the USPA Junior Championship and in 1938, he won the USPA Twenty Goal Championship. In 1938, he won the Monty Waterbury Memorial Cup.

Gerry was a renowned polo player. He won the US Open Polo Championship twice, first in 1939 playing the #2 position for the Bostwick Field team, and second, in 1940 playing the #2 position for the Aknusti team. He lost in finals of 1941 championship while playing for the Aknusti team.  From 1923 to 1941, all U.S. Open Polo Championship were played at Meadow Brook on Long Island, New York.

The 1939 Bostwick Field team included Pete Bostwick, Robert L. Gerry Jr., Elbridge T. Gerry Sr., Eric Horace Tyrrell-Martin.  In the 1940 U.S. Open Polo Championship final, the Aknusti team beat Great Neck. The final score was a close 5 to 4. Playing for Aknusti that year were Gerald Smith, Robert L. Gerry, Jr., Elbridge Gerry, and Alan Corey Jr.  The 1941 Aknusti team was composed of Elbridge T. Gerry Sr., Robert L. Gerry Jr., Edward H. Gerry, and Pete Bostwick.  In the U.S. Open finals, they played against Gulf Stream whose riders were Michael Grace Phipps, Ben Phipps, Charles Skiddy von Stade, and Alan L. Corey, Jr., who beat Aknusti 10–6.

Tennis career
Gerry was also, an accomplished Court tennis player. He won the Tuxedo Gold Racquet Singles Champion in 1946, as well as the U.S. Amateur Doubles Championship in both 1949 and 1950 playing with Alastair Martin. He was a Charter Member of the United States Court Tennis Association.

Personal life
Gerry married Martha Leighton Kramer, daughter of A. Ludlow Kramer. Together, they had:
Nancy Gerry (born 1935)
Robert L. Gerry III (born 1937)
He later married Harriet Wells.

Gerry inherited family lands in the Catskills, and added to them to create the sprawling  estate "Aknusti" (later renamed 'Broadlands'). It has acreage in the townships of Andes, Delhi, and Bovina, New York. Gerry owned the property until his death. The property has since been sold multiple times, although it remains intact and owned by Amanresorts.

References
Notes

Sources
Genealogy – Gerry family
Gerry family archive at Hartwick College
U.S. Open Polo history
1939 U.S. Open Polo Championship
Time Magazine documentation of 1941 loss in U.S. Open finals
 Standardbred Horsemans Memorial

1911 births
1979 deaths
Goelet family
Robert Livingston Gerry, Jr.
American polo players
American real tennis players
Gerry family